Pollanisus empyrea is a moth of the family Zygaenidae. It is endemic to the temperate parts of the Australian state of Western Australia.

The length of the forewings is 8–8.5 mm for males and females. It is probably at least partly bivoltine since adults have been found on wing in late summer and late autumn.

The head, thorax, forewing upperside and parts of the forewing and hindwing underside are covered with shiny (almost metallic) golden, greenish-golden or coppery-golden scales. There is also a rare colour variation with bluish-green parts. This variation was originally described as a distinct species.

The larvae probably feed on Hibbertia species.

External links
Australian Faunal Directory
Zygaenid moths of Australia: a revision of the Australian Zygaenidae

Moths of Australia
empyrea
Moths described in 1888